Scinax curicica, the lanceback treefrog, is a species of frog in the family Hylidae. It is endemic to Brazil. Its natural habitats are subtropical or tropical high-altitude grassland, intermittent rivers, and intermittent freshwater marshes.

References

curicica
Endemic fauna of Brazil
Amphibians of Brazil
Frogs of South America
Amphibians described in 2004
Taxonomy articles created by Polbot